The Roman Catholic Diocese of Ávila is a diocese located in the city of Ávila in the Ecclesiastical province of Valladolid in Spain.

History
 1102–1120: Administered by Jerome, bishop of Salamanca
 1121: Established as Diocese of Ávila

Leadership
 Priscillian (died 385)

Bishops of Ávila after 1381
Domingo Suárez, O.F.M. (30 Jul 1263 – 1271 Died)
Diego de los Roeles (1381–1394)
Alfonso de Echea o de Córdoba (1395–1403)
Juan Rodríguez de Guzmán (1403–1424)
Diego Gómez de Fuensalida (1424–1436)
Cardinal Juan de Cervantes (1437 – 19 August 1441, Appointed Bishop of Segovia)
Lope de Barrientos, O.P. (19 Jul 1441 – 7 Apr 1445 Appointed, Bishop of Cuenca)
Alonso de Fonseca y Ulloa (1445 – 4 Feb 1454 Appointed, Archbishop of Sevilla)
Alonso Fernández de Madrigal (1454–1455)
Martín Fernández de Vilches (1455–1469)
Alfonso de Fonseca (29 Jan 1469 – 26 Aug 1485 Appointed, Bishop of Cuenca)
Hernando de Talavera, O.S.H. (26 Aug 1485 – 23 Jan 1493 Appointed, Archbishop of Granada)
Francisco Sánchez de la Fuente (1493 – 1496 Appointed, Bishop of Córdoba)
Alfonso Carrillo de Albornoz (bishop) (27 Jun 1496 – 14 Jun 1514 Died)
Francisco Ruiz (bishop), O.F.M. (14 Jul 1514 – 23 Oct 1528 Died)
Rodrigo Sánchez Mercado (12 Jan 1530 – 25 Jan 1548 Died)
Diego Alava Esquivel (7 May 1548 – 21 Oct 1558 Appointed, Bishop of Córdoba)
Diego de los Cobos Molina (2 Aug 1559 – 4 Sep 1560 Appointed, Bishop of Jaén)
Alvaro Hurtado de Mendoza y Sarmiento (4 Sep 1560 – 11 Sep 1577 Appointed, Bishop of Palencia)
Sancho Busto de Villegas (5 Nov 1578 – 19 Jan 1581 Died)
Pedro Fernández Temiño (11 Sep 1581 – 29 Aug 1590 Died)
Jerónimo Manrique de Lara (5 Apr 1591 – 1 Sep 1595 Died)
Juan Velázquez de las Cuevas, O.P. (29 Apr 1596 – 11 Mar 1598 Died)
Lorenzo Asensio Otaduy Avendaño (1 Feb 1599 – 4 Dec 1611 Died)
Juan Alvarez de Caldas (14 May 1612 – 30 Nov 1615 Died)
Francisco González Zarate (de Gamarra) (30 May 1616 – 13 Dec 1626 Died)
Alfonso López Gallo (5 Jul 1627 Appointed, not installed)
Francisco Márquez Gaceta (29 Nov 1627 – 8 Nov 1631 Died)
Pedro Cifuentes Loarte (7 Jun 1632 – 19 May 1636 Died)
Diego Arce Reinoso (22 Mar 1638 – 8 Oct 1640 Confirmed, Bishop of Palencia)
Juan Vélez de Valdivielso (25 Feb 1641 – 21 Aug 1645 Appointed, Bishop of Cartagena (en España))
José de Argáiz Pérez (4 Dec 1645 – 27 Jul 1654 Appointed, Archbishop of Granada)
Bernardo Atayde de Lima Perera (5 Oct 1654 – 17 Feb 1656 Died)
Martín de Bonilla Granada (16 Oct 1656 – 21 Oct 1662 Died)
Francisco de Rojas-Borja y Artés (23 Apr 1663 – 29 May 1673 Appointed, Archbishop (Personal Title) of Cartagena (en España))
Juan Asensio Barrios, O. de M. (26 Jun 1673 – 20 Apr 1682 Appointed, Bishop of Jaén)
Diego Ventura Fernández de Angulo, O.F.M. (11 Jan 1683 – 17 Mar 1700 Died)
Gregorio Solórzano Castillo (10 May 1700 – 17 Jul 1703 Died)
Baltasar de la Peña Avilés (17 Dec 1703 – 7 Feb 1705 Died)
Julián Cano y Tevar, O. Carm. (17 Jan 1714 – 20 Apr 1719 Died)
José del Yermo Santibáñez (20 Mar 1720 – 8 Mar 1728 Appointed, Archbishop of Santiago de Compostela)
Pedro Ayala, O.P. (8 Mar 1728 – 22 Jun 1738 Resigned)
Narciso Queralt (23 Jun 1738 – 12 Jan 1743 Died)
Pedro González García (20 May 1743 – 7 Apr 1758 Died)
Romualdo Velarde y Cienfuegos (2 Oct 1758 – 11 May 1766 Died)
Miguel Fernando Merino (1 Dec 1766 – 10 Jul 1781 Died)
Antonio Sentmenat y Castellá (17 Feb 1783 – 22 Jun 1784 Resigned)
Julián Gascueña Herráiz, O.F.M. Disc. (20 Sep 1784 – 23 Nov 1796 Died)
Francisco Javier Cabrera Velasco (24 Jul 1797 – 22 Jan 1799 Died)
Rafael de Múzquiz y Aldunate (15 Apr 1799 – 20 Jul 1801 Appointed, Archbishop of Santiago de Compostela)
Manuel Gómez de Salazar (29 Mar 1802 – 3 Nov 1815 Died)
Rodrigo Antonio de Orellana, O. Praem. (21 Dec 1818 – 29 Jul 1822 Died)
Ramón María Adurriaga Uribe (24 May 1824 – 2 Feb 1841 Died)
Manuel López Santisteban (17 Dec 1847 – 30 Apr 1852 Resigned)
Gregorio Sánchez y Jiménez (Rubio), O.S.H. (27 Sep 1852 – 17 Feb 1854 Died)
Juan Alfonso Albuquerque Berión (23 Jun 1854 – 25 Sep 1857 Confirmed, Bishop of Córdoba)
Fernando Blanco y Lorenzo, O.P. (21 Dec 1857 – 17 Sep 1875 Confirmed, Archbishop of Valladolid)
Pedro José Sánchez Carrascosa y Carrión, C.O. (23 Sep 1875 – Jan 1882 Resigned)
Bl. Ciriaco María Sancha y Hervás (27 Mar 1882 – 10 Jun 1886 Appointed, Bishop of Madrid)
Ramón Fernández Piérola y Lopez de Luzuriaca (17 Mar 1887 – 30 Dec 1889 Appointed, Bishop of Vitoria)
Juan Muñoz y Herrera (26 Jun 1890 – 2 Dec 1895 Appointed, Bishop of Málaga)
José María Blanco Barón (2 Dec 1895 – 4 Apr 1897 Died)
Joaquín Beltrán y Asensio (24 Mar 1898 – 3 Nov 1917 Died)
Enrique Pla y Deniel (4 Dec 1918 – 28 Jan 1935 Appointed, Bishop of Salamanca)
Santos Moro Briz (21 Jun 1935 – 19 Oct 1968 Retired)
Maximino Romero de Lema (19 Oct 1968 – 21 Mar 1973 Appointed, Secretary of the Congregation for the Clergy)
Felipe Fernández García (22 Oct 1976 – 12 Jun 1991 Appointed, Bishop of San Cristóbal de La Laguna o Tenerife)
Antonio Cañizares Llovera (6 Mar 1992 – 10 Dec 1996 Appointed, Archbishop of Granada)
Adolfo González Montes (26 May 1997 – 15 Apr 2002 Appointed, Bishop of Almería)
Jesús García Burillo (9 Jan 2003 – 6 Nov 2018 Retired)
José María Gil Tamayo (6 Nov 2018 – 16 Jul 2022 Appointed, Coadjutor Archbishop of Granada)

See also
 Roman Catholicism in Spain
 Convento de San José (Ávila)

Sources

External links
 GCatholic.org
 Catholic Hierarchy 
 Diocese website

Roman Catholic dioceses in Spain
Roman Catholic dioceses established in the 11th century